Gordon 86 is a Cree reserve in Saskatchewan, Canada located  northwest of Fort Qu'Appelle. Also known as the George Gordon Reserve, it is one of three territories of the George Gordon First Nation, as arranged by the signing of Treaty 4. In the 2016 Canadian Census, it recorded a population of 837 living in 218 of its 238 total private dwellings. In the same year, its Community Well-Being index was calculated at 52 of 100, compared to 58.4 for the average First Nations community and 77.5 for the average non-Indigenous community. It is almost completely surrounded by the rural municipality of Touchwood No. 248.

References 

Indian reserves in Saskatchewan
Division No. 10, Saskatchewan
George Gordon First Nation